Rocío Cantuarias Rubio (born 20 March 1978) is a Chilean lawyer who was elected as a member of the Chilean Constitutional Convention.

References

External links
 BCN Profile

Living people
1979 births
Chilean women lawyers
21st-century Chilean politicians
Members of the Chilean Constitutional Convention
People from Concepción, Chile
21st-century Chilean women politicians
University of Concepción alumni
University of Chile alumni
21st-century Chilean lawyers